The  is a kei car manufactured by Honda between 2002 and 2007 for the Japanese market. The That's is based on the third-generation Honda Life kei car platform with a five-door "tall wagon" hatchback body, with considerable height.

The name "That's" was chosen in hope that the model could become a familiar car that makes people say "that's it!"

Overview 
The design of the That's was previewed by the Honda WIC ("What Is a Car") concept car at the 2001 Tokyo Motor Show in October.

The That's went on sale in Japan on February 8, 2002 with a monthly sales plan of 6,000 units. It was exclusively available at the Honda Primo dealership chain. It was available in both front-wheel drive and all-wheel drive versions, and it shares the Life's E07Z three-cylinder inline, 656 cc engine, available in either naturally aspirated or turbocharged versions (the latter was dropped in 2006 with the arrival of the turbocharged Honda Zest). All versions only come with a three-speed automatic transmission.

On October 15, 2004, Honda released a special version with a lower price. A minor facelift took place in 2006, with the facelifted That's debuting on March 22; at the same time, the turbocharged version was dropped.

Production of the That's ended in September 2007.

References

External links 

 

That's
Cars introduced in 2002
2000s cars
Front-wheel-drive vehicles
All-wheel-drive vehicles
Hatchbacks
Kei cars